Elections to the consultative Regional Council (Landesrat) were held in the territory of the Saar Basin on 25 June 1922. The Centre Party emerged as the largest faction, winning 16 of the 30 seats. Bartholomäus Koßmann of the Centre Party was elected President of the Landesrat on 19 July.

Results

References

Saar
Elections in Saarland
Parliamentary election
Saar